Adam Silvestri, known professionally as Radiator King, is an American punk/blues singer-songwriter and guitarist from Boston, Massachusetts. He is the lead vocalist and sole member of the act, occasionally using a supporting band while on tour and in studio. When asked about the name Radiator King, Silvestri stated that it came from when he "titled a friend’s painting and it was suggested to him that he use that name for his next band".

Silvestri has been recognized for his "rough, heart-wrenching vocals" and gritty sound. Established officially in 2011, Radiator King has released three studio albums, Launching Day, Document Untold, and A Hollow Triumph After All.

Radiator King most recently toured this summer in support of A Hollow Triumph After All. During off days, Silvestri wrote and recorded new songs for a future release. Independent record label, SoundEvolution Music (SI, NY) will be releasing three of these tracks on an upcoming 7" vinyl single.

Band members
 Adam Silvestri - vocals, guitar

Touring members
 Shaul Eshet - piano, organ, vibraphone, synth 
 Adam Moses - drums, percussion 
 Ed "Harlem Wolverine" Goldson - bass
 Brian Viglione - drums, percussion

Discography
 Unborn Ghosts (2019)
 A Hollow Triumph After All (2017)
 Document Untold (2015)
 Launching Day (2012)

References

External links

Singers from New York (state)